The Clubhouse Network, often shortened to "The Clubhouse," is an American nonprofit organization that provides a free out-of-school learning program where children (ages 10–19) from lower income communities can work with adult mentors to explore their own ideas, develop new skills, and build confidence in themselves through the use of technology. Its motto is "Where Technology Meets Imagination."

Initially founded in 1993 as the Computer Clubhouse, The Clubhouse is the brainchild of Mitchel Resnick and Natalie Rusk of the MIT Media Lab in Cambridge, Massachusetts, and Stina Cooke of Boston's Computer Museum.

From 2000 - 2015, with an investment of over $50 million from Intel, The Clubhouse Network grew to support nearly 100 community-based Clubhouses in 18 countries: Argentina, Australia, Brazil, Colombia, Costa Rica, Denmark, Ireland, Israel, Jordan, Mexico, New Zealand, Palestine, Panama, Philippines, Russia, Taiwan, South Africa, and the United States.

In 2012, Best Buy partnered with The Clubhouse Network to launch multiple learning sites throughout the U.S., operating under the name "Best Buy Teen Tech Centers." The Clubhouse Network provides access to resources, skills, and experience to 25,000 youth per year, to help them succeed in their careers, contribute to their communities, and improve their quality of life.

From 2000 to 2017, led by longtime Executive Director Gail Breslow, The Clubhouse Network was part of the Museum of Science, Boston. In 2018, it was separated from the Museum and relocated to Dudley Square in the heart of Roxbury, in order to serve more youth and families within the community. 

In 1997, The Clubhouse won the Peter F. Drucker Award for Non-Profit Innovation, for inspiring underserved youth, both locally and as a learning model environment globally, to consider themselves as competent, creative, and critical learners.

In 2016, The Clubhouse partnered with the MIT Media Lab and Maker Media to publish Start Making! A Guide To Engaging Young People in Maker Activities.

Clubhouses have been utilized as the proving ground for a number of projects of the MIT Media Lab's "Lifelong Kindergarten" research group. Notable examples include: 
 Lego Mindstorms programmable bricks, a late 20th-century robotic construction toy.
 PICO programmable Crickets, early 21st-century programmable toys for art construction projects
 Scratch, a 21st-century multimedia programming language for young people.

References

External links
 
 The Clubhouse Village
 Global RE@CH Media Festival

Youth development organizations
After school programs
International educational charities
United States educational programs
Project-based learning
Educational charities based in the United States
Youth organizations based in Massachusetts